R v Goltz, [1991] 3 S.C.R. 485 is a leading constitutional decision of the Supreme Court of Canada on the right against cruel and unusual punishment under section 12 of the Canadian Charter of Rights and Freedoms. The Court considered a test for cruel and unusual punishment and found that based on the test the BC Motor Vehicle Act which requires a minimum sentence of 7 days in prison and a fine for a first conviction for driving without a licence.

Background
In June 1987, Willy Goltz was charged and convicted under s. 88(1) of the B.C. Motor Vehicle Act.  He had been driving with a suspended licence.

At the BC provincial court, Goltz was convicted. It was argued that the provision violated the right against cruel and unusual punishment, but was rejected.

Judgment of the Supreme Court of Canada
Justice Gonthier, writing for the majority, granted the appeal and concluded that the provision was not in violation of section 12 of the Charter.

See also
 List of Supreme Court of Canada cases

External links
 

Canadian Charter of Rights and Freedoms case law
Supreme Court of Canada cases
1991 in Canadian case law
Canadian criminal case law